José Ángel Iribar Kortajarena (born 1 March 1943), nicknamed El Chopo ("the Poplar"), is a Spanish retired football goalkeeper and manager.

Having played almost exclusively for Athletic Bilbao, he appeared in more than 600 official games for the club over the course of 18 La Liga seasons, winning two major titles.

Iribar represented the Spain national team in the 1964 Nations' Cup and the 1966 World Cup, winning the former tournament.

Club career
Iribar was born in Zarautz, Gipuzkoa. After only three La Liga games in his first professional season at Athletic Bilbao, he proceeded to become the Basques' undisputed starter for the following 16 seasons; his senior starts were made at CD Basconia in 1961, when the latter was still not the feeder team: they eliminated Atlético Madrid in the Copa del Generalísimo, and the keeper's stellar performance prompted his signing for a then-record 1 million pesetas.

At Athletic, Iribar profited from injury to Carmelo Cedrún in October 1963 and never looked back, winning two Spanish Cups and reaching the final of the 1976–77 UEFA Cup, lost to Juventus FC. During the 1970–71 campaign he kept a clean sheet at ten successive home games, which translated into a record of 1,018 minutes.

 Iribar was awarded a benefit match in 1971, a 1–1 draw against West Bromwich Albion (the former club of Athletic's manager at the time, Ronnie Allen), having already played the same opponents a few weeks earlier in England for Bobby Hope's testimonial. He retired nine years later at 37, having played in 614 matches in all competitions (a club record by some margin), as another club great in the position, Andoni Zubizarreta, would arrive in the summer; he also held its appearance record in European competition until 2016, when his total of 55 was passed by Markel Susaeta.

Subsequently, Iribar joined Athletic's coaching staff, taking charge of the goalkeepers. In 1983–84 he coached the reserve team Bilbao Athletic, leading them to the second place in the second division, a best-ever, although they were not eligible for promotion.

Iribar also managed the first team in the 1986–87 season – for the only time, the league had a second stage divided in three groups, and Athletic 'won' the relegation section (ranking 13th overall). From 1988 and for over two decades, he was in charge of the Basque Country representative team.

International career
Iribar made his debut for Spain on 11 March 1964, in the first leg of the 1964 European Nations' Cup's last qualifying stage, a 5–1 home win against the Republic of Ireland (7–1 aggregate). He was the starter during the finals, and the nation emerged victorious on home soil.

Iribar also represented Spain at the 1966 FIFA World Cup, playing all three group stage matches. He retained his position for a further ten years; on 20 November 1974, in a UEFA Euro 1976 qualifier away to Scotland, he equalled the record of 46 caps held by fellow goalkeeper Ricardo Zamora, and overtook him the following 5 February at home to the same opponents. His 49th and final game was on 24 April 1976 in a 1–1 draw against West Germany in the quarter-finals of the same tournament; he missed the second leg, officially due to a finger injury, which he denied decades later amidst theories that he was dropped for his political views. Another goalkeeper, Luis Arconada, took his record in 1983.

Style of play
Spanish 2010 World Cup winning goalkeeper Iker Casillas included Iribar in his list of the ten greatest goalkeepers of all time, and described him as "one of the greatest keepers Spain has ever produced. He was a big presence in goal and had that ability to intimidate opponents. But it wasn't all about his size, which is useless on its own. He combined his physicality with terrific positioning." In Italy, the former was given the nickname "Zoff's twin", due to his goalkeeping ability, leadership and physical resemblance to Italian counterpart Dino Zoff.

Political views
On 5 December 1976, before a game against Real Sociedad, Iribar and the opposing captain, Inaxio Kortabarria, carried out the Ikurriña, the Basque flag, and placed it ceremonially on the centre-circle. This was the first public display of the flag since the death of Francisco Franco, but it was still illegal.

He subsequently became involved in Basque local politics, and was a founding member of the independentist coalition Herri Batasuna.

International statistics

Honours

Athletic Bilbao
Copa del Generalísimo: 1969, 1972–73; runner-up 1965–66, 1966–67, 1976–77
UEFA Cup: runner-up 1976–77

Spain
UEFA European Championship: 1964

Individual
Ricardo Zamora Trophy: 1969–70

See also
 List of Athletic Bilbao players (+200 appearances)
 List of La Liga players (400+ appearances)

References

External links

Athletic Bilbao manager profile

1943 births
1964 European Nations' Cup players
1966 FIFA World Cup players
Athletic Bilbao B managers
Athletic Bilbao managers
Association football goalkeepers
Athletic Bilbao footballers
Basque Country international footballers
Footballers from the Basque Country (autonomous community)
Basque nationalists
CD Basconia footballers
Herri Batasuna politicians
La Liga managers
La Liga players
Living people
People from Zarautz
Segunda División managers
Segunda División players
Spain international footballers
Spanish footballers
Spanish football managers
UEFA European Championship-winning players